William Keith, 7th Earl Marischal (16101670 or 1671) was a Scottish nobleman and Covenanter. He was the eldest son of William Keith, 6th Earl Marischal.

Life
During the English Civil War, the 7th Earl Marischal joined James Graham, 1st Marquess of Montrose against the Gordons and twice seized Aberdeen in 1639, including a march with Montrose and 9,000 men along the Causey Mounth past Muchalls Castle and through the Portlethen Moss to attack via the Bridge of Dee.

He was appointed a Lord of the Articles after the pacification of Berwick-upon-Tweed, and again seized Aberdeen and enforced signatures of the covenant in 1640. In 1641, he was appointed a Privy Councillor.

He attended covenanting committees in the north but remained inactive in 1643–44. He subsequently refused to give up fugitives to Montrose, and was besieged at Dunnottar Castle in 1645. He took no active steps against the popular party until he joined Hamilton's expedition into England in 1648, escaping from the rout at the Battle of Preston, and entertained Charles II at Dunnottar in 1650. In 1651, the Scottish regalia were left for safe keeping in his castle. He was arrested at Alyth with many other Scottish nobles and generals in an incident known as 'the Onfall of Alyth' and imprisoned in the Tower of London until the Restoration, when he was appointed Keeper of the Privy Seal of Scotland.

The Earl Marischal married, in 1637, Lady Elizabeth Seton (1621–1650), daughter of George Seton, 3rd Earl of Winton, by his spouse Lady Anna Hay, daughter of Francis Hay, 9th Earl of Erroll. They had the following issue: 
 William Keith, Lord Keith, died young.
 Mary Keith, married firstly to Sir James Hope of Hopetoun in 1657, and secondly to Sir Archibald Murray, 3rd Baronet of Blackbarony.
 Elizabeth Keith, married in 1658, Robert Arbuthnot, 2nd Viscount Arbuthnot
 Jean Keith, married in 1669, George Ogilvy, 3rd Lord Banff

Arms

See also
 Cromwell's Act of Grace under which the earl's estates were confiscated by the Commonwealth.

References

Keith, William, 7th Earl Marischal
Keith, William, 7th Earl Marischal
Keith, William, 7th Earl Marischal
Earls Marischal
1610 births
Members of the Parliament of Scotland 1639–1641
Members of the Convention of the Estates of Scotland 1643–44
Members of the Parliament of Scotland 1644–1647
Members of the Convention of the Estates of Scotland 1667